Esporte Clube Propriá, commonly known as Propriá, is a Brazilian football club based in Propriá, Sergipe state. They won the Campeonato Sergipano once.

History
The club was founded on October 12, 1913, as Sergipe Foot-Ball Club. The club was renamed to Esporte Clube Propriá on June 14, 1956.

Stadium
Esporte Clube Propriá play their home games at Estádio Constantino Tavares. The stadium has a maximum capacity of 5,000 people.

References

Association football clubs established in 1913
Football clubs in Sergipe
1913 establishments in Brazil